Many attacks occurred in 2020 in Iraq. They left at least 34 people dead and another 24 were injured. An insurgent was also killed.

Timeline of attacks

References

2020 murders in Iraq
Attacks on buildings and structures in 2020
Attacks on buildings and structures in Iraq
Attacks on military installations in the 2020s
August 2020 crimes in Asia
Diyala Governorate
History of Baghdad Governorate
History of Kirkuk Governorate
History of Mosul
March 2020 events in Iraq
Mass murder in 2020
September 2020 crimes in Asia
September 2020 events in Asia